The San Clemente wren (Thryomanes bewickii leucophrys) was a subspecies of Bewick's wren. It was mainly distributed on San Clemente Island, off the southern coast of California. The San Clemente wren is extinct, with the last sighting in 1941.

Description
The San Clemente wren measured about 14 cm (5.5 in) in length, with a wingspan of about 5.5 cm (2.2 in). The plumage on top was brown with a grey wash, with a white eye-stripe. The underparts were a mix of grey and white, with the lower tail coverts having black bars.

Extinction
In the early 20th century, the San Clemente wren was reported to be common on San Clemente Island. However, habitat destruction from goats led to the demise of the species by the middle of the century.

References

Extinct birds of North America
Troglodytidae
Birds described in 1895
Fauna of the Channel Islands of California